Basic body awareness therapy is an evidence-based treatment form in physiotherapy that was first developed in the 1970s. It represents a holistic approach to human movements considering physical, physiological, psychological and existential aspects of human existence.  B-BAT aims to bring aspects of health and human resources to the fore.
 
B-BAT is based on the theory of psychotherapist Jacques Dropsy and his movement system.  It has roots in a number of different movement systems from Western and Eastern traditions, (Alexander, Feldenkrais, Gindler, Idla, Zen meditation, T'ai chi) emphasizing the body and nonverbal communication as a gateway to personal empowerment.  B-BAT has integrated elements from humanistic and existential philosophy (Kierkegaard, Heidegger, Sartre), and psychology (Reich, Jung, Lowen) and includes aspects from natural science, movement science, actors training, modern dance and fine art.

The aim of B-BAT is to establish increased awareness of the body and consciousness in movements, progressing towards less effort and a better function in being, doing and relating. The therapy program includes movements from everyday life, lying, sitting, standing and walking.  It also includes the use of voice, relational exercises and massage. Free-breathing, balance and awareness in all exercises are central.

B-BAT includes assessment tools, the body awareness rating scale (BARS), the body awareness scale (BAS), and BAS- interview, and includes a structured therapy model. A number of studies have been done on this therapy approach proving it beneficial for people suffering from a number of pathological medical conditions.

B-BAT aims to increase the physiotherapist's personal and professional development, in clinical practice and research. It emphasizes processes, knowledge, experiences and qualitative-oriented research methodology and methods. 
B-BAT is a well-known approach used by physiotherapists in mental health and community-based physiotherapy, especially in the Northern part of Europe. It has been introduced at university level by B-BAT teachers and is part of training and research programs. There is an expanding international network, originating from the Swedish-Norwegian group of authorized teachers responsible for the quality-security of the method.

Sources 
 Skattebo, Ulla-britt: Basic Body Awareness Therapy and Movement Harmony.  Oslo University College, 2005. 
 Nettsted: www.hib.no/fagplaner/basic bam
 Nettsted: www.hib.no › Studier (Basic Body Awareness Methodology (BBAM) – Studier – Høgskolen i Bergen)

Methodology